Moonzund is a 1988 Soviet war film based on Valentin Pikul's 1970 novel of the same name. "Moonzund" refers to the West Estonian archipelago, where the Battle of Moon Sound took place during World War I.

Plot  
Epic film set during the First World War brightly illustrates the struggles of Russian Empire in the years 1915–1917. The hardships of war cause major social and political unrest in the Tsarist Russia. Communist propaganda provokes conflicts between classes causing clashes and un-subordination aboard battleships of Russian Imperial Navy and on locations in Tallinn, Kronstadt and Saint Petersburg. Torn by internal class struggle, Russian Navy is weakened and loses major battles in the Baltic theater of war. Against this background, the commanding admirals of the Russian Navy are powerless witnesses of the tragic collapse of the fleet in terms of nascent revolutionary events of 1917. Most film characters are officers and sailors of the Baltic Fleet.

Cast 
 Oleg Menshikov as Captain Sergey Arten'ev
 Vladimir Gostyukhin as Semenchuk
 Lyudmila Nilskaya as spy Anna "Klara Georgievna" Revelskaya
 Nikolai Karachentsov as officer Von Knupfer
 Yury Belyayev as Admiral Kolchak
 Boris Klyuyev as Von Grapf
 Vija Artmane as Frau Milch
 Aleksei Buldakov as Portnyagin, sailor
 Vladimir Baranov as orderly Platov
 Yevgenia Dobrovolskaya as Irina Artenyeva
 Yevgeniy Yevstigneyev as Admiral Nikolai Essen
 Sergei Garmash as Pavel Dybenko
 Vladimir Yeryomin as Leonid Deichman, Mechanical Engineer
 Vladimir Golovin as von Den
 Petr Shelokhonov as Captain Andreev
 Victor Kostetskiy as commander of the cruiser "Rurik"

External links

1987 films
1980s war drama films
World War I films set on the Eastern Front
1980s Russian-language films
Lenfilm films
Soviet war drama films
Biographical films about military leaders
Cultural depictions of Alexander Kolchak
1987 drama films